CHA Everett Hospital (formerly CHA Whidden Hospital/ Whidden Memorial Hospital) is a 162-bed medical/surgical and psychiatric hospital in Everett, Massachusetts. It is one of three hospitals in Cambridge Health Alliance.

Located at 103 Garland Street, CHA Everett Hospital serves the 200,000 residents of Everett, Revere, Chelsea, Winthrop, and Malden, MA, as the only hospital in the five-city area.

Services 
Cambridge Health Alliance has made many changes at CHA Everett Hospital. This includes a 64-slice CT Scanner, open MRI, Digital Mammography services, and an Emergency Department.

CHA Everett Hospital campus has a wide variety of health services including:

24-hour Emergency Department
Radiology and Imaging
Medical Specialties
Surgical Specialties
Rehabilitation
Pulmonary Rehab

Service Highlights
Community Hospital Cancer Program, Am. College of Surgeons Commission on Cancer 
Primary Stroke Service, MA Department of Public Health

Academics
CHA Everett Hospital is a teaching site for the Tufts University School of Medicine. Cambridge Health Alliance is also a teaching affiliate of Harvard Medical School, Harvard School of Public Health, Harvard School of Dental Medicine.

External links
Cambridge Health Alliance Website
CHA Everett Hospital Website
CHA Provider Directory
Everett Women's Imaging Center

Further Information 
 WCVB - Channel 5 Boston, "Harvard Program Focuses On Bedside Manner", WCVB, September 27, 2011
 Bielaszka-DuVernay, Christina, "Taking Public Health Approaches To Care In Massachusetts", Health Affairs, September 2011
Conaboy, Chelsea, "Connecting underserved patients to preventive care", Boston.com, May 23, 2011
Nesin, Marjorie, "Cambridge Health wins Harvard Medical School Diversity Award", Boston.com, May 6, 2011
 Shaw, Gienna, "Case Study: The Coordinated ED", Health Leaders Media Breakthroughs, April 29, 2011
 AAMC, "The Academic Researcher: Bringing Science to Health Care Delivery", Association of American Medical Colleges, April 20, 2011
 Daniel, Seth, "Practicing Teamwork – Revere Clinic is All About Collaboration and Communication", Revere Journal, March 3, 2011
 Parker, Brock, "Check online for hospital emergency room wait times", Boston.com, February 18, 2011
 Laidler, John, "Health care focusing on teamwork", Boston.com, December 16, 2010
 Falco, Miriam, "Study: Lack of breastfeeding costs lives, billions of dollars", CNN.com, April 6, 2010
 Fennimore, Jillian, "Federal funds help heal ailing Cambridge Health Alliance", Cambridge Chronicle, March 25, 2009

Hospitals in Middlesex County, Massachusetts